"New Rules" is a 2017 song by Dua Lipa.

New Rules may also refer to:
New Rules (book), a 2005 book by Bill Maher
#NewRules (Alexandra Burke EP), 2012
New Rules (Weki Meki EP), 2020
New Rules (band), an English-Irish pop boy band
"New Rules", a segment on Real Time with Bill Maher
New Rules, a five issue arc of Buffy the Vampire Slayer Season Ten
"New Rules", a song by TXT from The Dream Chapter: Magic